Bagmasti was a famous Armenian goddess. She was worshiped at Musasir in Ararat and was the companion or consort of Ḫaldi. Her temple, together with that of Ḫaldi was plundered and burned by Sargon II king of Assyria.

Sources 

Armenian goddesses